The Montreal Canadiens are a National Hockey League (NHL) franchise based in Montreal, Canada. Established in 1909, the club had its first game in January 1910.  The Canadiens have won 24 Stanley Cups, 23 of them since the founding of the NHL in 1917.  Below is a list of Montreal Canadiens goaltenders.

Chronological listing of Montreal Canadiens goalies
(Only goaltenders who played in at least one game, either regular season or during playoffs, are listed. Priority in list order each season is based on number of minutes played in the regular season and playoffs combined.)
  2021–2022: Jake Allen, Samuel Montembeault, Cayden Primeau, Carey Price, Andrew Hammond, Michael McNiven
  2020–2021: Carey Price, Jake Allen, Cayden Primeau
  2019–2020: Carey Price, Charlie Lindgren, Keith Kinkaid, Cayden Primeau
  2018–2019: Carey Price, Antti Niemi, Charlie Lindgren
  2017–2018: Carey Price, Antti Niemi, Charlie Lindgren, Al Montoya
  2016–2017: Carey Price, Al Montoya, Charlie Lindgren
  2015–2016: Mike Condon, Ben Scrivens, Carey Price, Dustin Tokarski, Charlie Lindgren
  2014–2015: Carey Price, Dustin Tokarski
  2013–2014: Carey Price, Peter Budaj, Dustin Tokarski
  2012–2013: Carey Price, Peter Budaj
  2011–2012: Carey Price, Peter Budaj
  2010–2011: Carey Price, Alex Auld
  2009–2010: Jaroslav Halak, Carey Price
  2008–2009: Carey Price, Jaroslav Halak, Marc Denis
  2007–2008: Carey Price, Cristobal Huet, Jaroslav Halak
  2006–2007: Cristobal Huet, David Aebischer, Yann Danis, Jaroslav Halak
  2005–2006: Cristobal Huet, Jose Theodore, David Aebischer, Yann Danis
  2004–2005: NHL lockout
  2003–2004: Jose Theodore, Mathieu Garon
  2002–2003: Jose Theodore, Jeff Hackett, Mathieu Garon
  2001–2002: Jose Theodore, Jeff Hackett, Mathieu Garon, Stephane Fiset, Olivier Michaud
  2000–2001: Jose Theodore, Jeff Hackett, Mathieu Garon, Eric Fichaud
  1999–2000: Jeff Hackett, Jose Theodore
  1998–1999: Jeff Hackett, Jose Theodore, Jocelyn Thibault, Frederic Chabot
  1997–1998: Andy Moog, Jocelyn Thibault, Jose Theodore (playoffs only)
  1996–1997: Jocelyn Thibault, Jose Theodore, Pat Jablonski, Tomas Vokoun
  1995–1996: Jocelyn Thibault, Pat Jablonski, Patrick Roy, Patrick Labrecque, Jose Theodore
  1994–1995: Patrick Roy, Ron Tugnutt
  1993–1994: Patrick Roy, Andre Racicot, Ron Tugnutt, Les Kuntar, Frederic Chabot
  1992–1993: Patrick Roy, Andre Racicot, Frederic Chabot
  1991–1992: Patrick Roy, Roland Melanson, Andre Racicot
  1990–1991: Patrick Roy, Andre Racicot, Jean-Claude Bergeron, Frederic Chabot
  1989–1990: Patrick Roy, Brian Hayward, Andre Racicot
  1988–1989: Patrick Roy, Brian Hayward, Randy Exelby
  1987–1988: Patrick Roy, Brian Hayward, Vincent Riendeau
  1986–1987: Patrick Roy, Brian Hayward
  1985–1986: Patrick Roy, Doug Soetaert, Steve Penney
  1984–1985: Steve Penney, Doug Soetaert, Patrick Roy
  1983–1984: Rick Wamsley, Richard Sevigny, Steve Penney, Mark Holden
  1982–1983: Rick Wamsley, Richard Sevigny, Mark Holden
  1981–1982: Rick Wamsley, Denis Herron, Richard Sevigny, Mark Holden
  1980–1981: Richard Sevigny, Michel Larocque, Denis Herron, Rick Wamsley
  1979–1980: Michel Larocque, Denis Herron, Richard Sevigny
  1978–1979: Ken Dryden, Michel Larocque
  1977–1978: Ken Dryden, Michel Larocque
  1976–1977: Ken Dryden, Michel Larocque
  1975–1976: Ken Dryden, Michel Larocque
  1974–1975: Ken Dryden, Michel Larocque
  1973–1974: Wayne Thomas, Michel Larocque, Michel Plasse
  1972–1973: Ken Dryden, Michel Plasse, Wayne Thomas
  1971–1972: Ken Dryden, Phil Myre, Denis DeJordy, Rogatien Vachon
  1970–1971: Rogatien Vachon, Phil Myre, Ken Dryden
  1969–1970: Rogatien Vachon, Phil Myre, Lorne Worsley
  1968–1969: Rogatien Vachon, Lorne Worsley, Tony Esposito, Ernie Wakely
  1967–1968: Lorne Worsley, Rogatien Vachon
  1966–1967: Charlie Hodge, Rogatien Vachon, Lorne Worsley, Garry Bauman
  1965–1966: Lorne Worsley, Charlie Hodge
  1964–1965: Charlie Hodge, Lorne Worsley
  1963–1964: Charlie Hodge, Lorne Worsley, Jean-Guy Morissette
  1962–1963: Jacques Plante, Cesare Maniago, Ernie Wakely
  1961–1962: Jacques Plante
  1960–1961: Jacques Plante, Charlie Hodge
  1959–1960: Jacques Plante, Charlie Hodge
  1958–1959: Jacques Plante, Charlie Hodge, Claude Pronovost, Claude Cyr
  1957–1958: Jacques Plante, Charlie Hodge, Len Broderick, John Aiken
  1956–1957: Jacques Plante, Gerry McNeil
  1955–1956: Jacques Plante, Bob Perreault
  1954–1955: Jacques Plante, Charlie Hodge, Claude Evans, Andre Binette
  1953–1954: Gerry McNeil, Jacques Plante
  1952–1953: Gerry McNeil, Jacques Plante, Hal Murphy
  1951–1952: Gerry McNeil
  1950–1951: Gerry McNeil
  1949–1950: Bill Durnan, Gerry McNeil
  1948–1949: Bill Durnan
  1947–1948: Bill Durnan, Gerry McNeil
  1946–1947: Bill Durnan
  1945–1946: Bill Durnan, Paul Bibeault
  1944–1945: Bill Durnan
  1943–1944: Bill Durnan
  1942–1943: Paul Bibeault
  1941–1942: Paul Bibeault, Bert Gardiner
  1940–1941: Bert Gardiner, Paul Bibeault, Wilf Cude
  1939–1940: Claude Bourque, Wilf Cude, Mike Karakas, Charlie Sands
  1938–1939: Claude Bourque, Wilf Cude 
  1937–1938: Wilf Cude, Paul Gauthier
  1936–1937: Wilf Cude, George Hainsworth
  1935–1936: Wilf Cude, Abbie Cox
  1934–1935: Wilf Cude
  1933–1934: Lorne Chabot, Wilf Cude
  1932–1933: George Hainsworth
  1931–1932: George Hainsworth, Albert Leduc (Canadiens defenceman, replaced Hainsworth in net on one occasion while Hainsworth served a two-minute penalty)
  1930–1931: George Hainsworth
  1929–1930: George Hainsworth, Roy Worters, Mickey Murray
  1928–1929: George Hainsworth
  1927–1928: George Hainsworth
  1926–1927: George Hainsworth
  1925–1926: Herb Rhéaume, Alphonse Lacroix, Bill Taugher, Georges Vézina
  1924–1925: Georges Vézina
  1923–1924: Georges Vézina
  1922–1923: Georges Vézina
  1921–1922: Georges Vézina, Sprague Cleghorn (Canadiens defenceman, replaced Vézina in net on one occasion while Vézina served a two-minute penalty)
  1920–1921: Georges Vézina
  1919–1920: Georges Vézina
  1918–1919: Georges Vézina
  1917–1918: Georges Vézina
  1916–1917: Georges Vézina
  1915–1916: Georges Vézina
  1914–1915: Georges Vézina
  1913–1914: Georges Vézina
  1912–1913: Georges Vézina
  1911–1912: Georges Vézina
  1910–1911: Georges Vézina
  1910: Joseph Cattarinich, Teddy Groulx

goaltenders